Ulnaria ulna is a species of diatom belonging to the family Ulnariaceae.

Synonym:
 Synedra ulna (Nitzsch) Ehrenberg 1832

References

Diatoms